Walsh Island is a Gaelic Athletic Association club located in the village of Walsh Island in County Offaly, Ireland. With 12 Senior Football wins and 2 Leinster Championship wins, they are one of the most successful clubs in the Offaly.

History
Before the club was formed in 1930, many players from Walsh Island played for nearby Geashill GAA. It was decided that the club's colours would be the green and white hoops of Shamrock Rovers, the top football club in Ireland. The hoops did not clash with any club colours in North Offaly and were adopted as the colours. The first match played by Walsh Island was against Ballykeane. The club won the Offaly Senior Football Championship in 1933, their first year in the competition. Walsh Island was now the dominant team in the county and remained so until 1943.

After many years the club became the dominant force in Offaly once more in 1977, losing the Championship Semi Final to Tullamore GAA that year and winning it for the next six consecutive years. In 1979 and 1980 Walsh island won the Leinster Senior Club Football Championship, becoming one of the only clubs in Leinster to have 2 consecutive wins in the competition and the second club from Offaly to win it.

Honours
Offaly Senior Football Championships: 12
 1933, 1934, 1937, 1938, 1942, 1943, 1978, 1979, 1980, 1981, 1982, 1983
Leinster Senior Club Football Championships: 2
 1979, 1980
 Offaly Intermediate Football Championship (1)
 2009
  U21 Football Championship 1974
 Offaly Junior Football Championship (3)
 1932, 1961, 1996

Notable players
Richie Connor
Willie Bryan
Matt Connor
Liam Connor
Tomás Connor
Brian Connor

References
http://www.walshislandgaaclub.com/index.html 

Gaelic games clubs in County Offaly
Gaelic football clubs in County Offaly